The Onterie Center is a sixty-story award-winning high rise in downtown Chicago, Illinois, United States.  It is located at 441 East Erie St, and takes its name from a conflation of "Ontario" and "Erie", the streets at its two entrances.

Designed by Skidmore, Owings & Merrill, construction was completed in 1986.  The building is two towers: a 60-story Main Tower and an 11-story Auxiliary Tower. At 570 feet (174 m), the Main Tower claims its place among the 50 tallest buildings in Chicago.

The building is considered the "final work" by respected Bangladeshi-American structural engineer and designer Fazlur Rahman Khan. Completed after his death, the diagonal brace structure is dedicated to Khan, and serves as an architectural nod to his John Hancock Center. The X formations on the exterior are concrete infill panels which act together to form a truss tube. There are no steel beams behind them. A similar structured building, 780 Third Avenue in New York City, was completed in 1983. Onterie Center is the first concrete high-rise in the world to use diagonal shearwalls at the building perimeter. This type of design uses fewer columns and allows for a distinct unit layout. In 1986 this building won the Best Structure Award from the Structural Engineers Association of Illinois.

See also
List of tallest buildings in Chicago

References

External links
Official Onterie Center Website
Emporis.com

Residential skyscrapers in Chicago
Apartment buildings in Chicago
Bangladeshi inventions
Skyscraper office buildings in Chicago
Skidmore, Owings & Merrill buildings
Residential buildings completed in 1986
Streeterville, Chicago
1986 establishments in Illinois
Fazlur Khan buildings